Katnaghbyur  is a village in the Talin Municipality of the Aragatsotn Province of Armenia. The village has the ruins of a 5th-century church.

References 

Report of the results of the 2001 Armenian Census
World Gazetteer: Armenia – World-Gazetteer.com

Populated places in Aragatsotn Province